Erik Gustaf Bernhard Boström (11 February 1842 – 21 February 1907) was a Swedish landowner and politician who was a member of the Swedish Parliament (1876–1907) and the longest-serving Prime Minister of Sweden of the 19th century. He served twice, first from 1891 to 1900 and then again from 1902 to 1905. He was also known as E.G. Boström or E. Gust. Boström.

In 1871, he married Carolina "Lina" Almqvist, with whom he had six daughters and one son. Brother of County Governor Filip Boström and nephew of the philosopher Christopher Jacob Boström.

Boström's governmental policy was marked by its pragmatism. Over time, Boström gained a good reputation as being a rallying national icon despite being the first prime minister to have neither an academic education nor experience with upper governmental positions. He was also quite popular with King Oscar II. Boström's eventual downfall was caused by his refusal to budge on the issue of Norway.

Childhood and career
Erik Gustaf Boström was born in Stockholm, the son of Eric Samuel Boström, chief judge of the district court and his wife Elisabet Gustava Fredenheim. The family was one branch of the Laestadius family of priests from Norrland. His paternal grandfather Christopher Laestander, a townsman and ship carpenter in the city of Piteå, took the surname Boström.

He was tutored by Kristian Claëson, whose first cousin served as the Minister of Ecclesiastical Affairs under Boström in 1898. In 1854, he became a student at the Uppsala Cathedral School, which was also the year his father died. It is worth noting that five of his fellow cabinet members during his first term attended the same school: Axel Rappe, Edvard von Krusenstjerna, Ludvig Annerstedt, Gustaf Gilljam and Lars Åkerhielm. In 1861, he transferred to Uppsala University, where he studied until 1863 when his mother died and he had to take over her manor at Östanå Castle.

As a youth he availed himself of the opportunity to pay to avoid conscription, which was last possible in 1872.

Boström was quite successful as a farmer and he started to get involved in local politics. In January 1870, he became a member of the executive committee of the Agricultural Society of Stockholm County and of the county council of Stockholm County, where he also served as vice-chairperson and chairperson for many years. In 1871, he married Carolina Almqvist, daughter of Justice Councillor and Minister Ludvig Almqvist. In 1875, he was elected to the lower house of parliament to represent the judicial district of Södra Roslagen. In parliament, he joined the Lantmanna Party and quickly positioned himself as a leading protectionist, supporting tariff protection, in the Standing Committees of Ways and Means and of Banking. In addition, he was interested in a strong defence, which he considered to have manifested itself as a strong marine defence, and a strong opposition to the abolition of the Swedish allotment system.

Chancellor of the Swedish Universities 1905–1907 
After he retired from his position as Prime Minister, Boström became the Chancellor of the Swedish Universities, where he tried unsuccessfully to prevent Bengt Lidforss from continuing on as associate professor at Lund University. He then tendered his resignation from his position as chancellor, although he quickly retracted it. Boström continued to be interested in politics and in a letter that he wrote to his dear old friend Carl Herslow on 4 June, he stated that it would be extremely desirable for the recently retired government to have been able to stay on. He also said in a letter that Karl Staaff's government could take of social policy better than a conservative government could and that Staaff occasionally appeared to possess the ability to accomplish a lot, although he chose a different way. Boström died in his home in Stockholm on 21 February 1907. A few days later, the bells pealed out over Stockholm to commemorate the former Prime Minister.

Family
One brother, County Governor of Södermanland County Filip Boström.
Three sisters, including Ebba Boström
Six daughters: Hedvig, Carolina Elisabeth, Sofia Lovisa, Clara Gustafva, Ingeborg Maria and Eva Margareta.
One son: Chamberlain Gustaf Samuel Boström.
Married to Carolina Almqvist, daughter of Councillor of Justice and Minister Ludvig Almqvist.

References

External links

1842 births
1907 deaths
Politicians from Stockholm
Members of the Andra kammaren
Prime Ministers of Sweden
Swedish Ministers for Finance
Uppsala University alumni
19th-century Swedish politicians